Stereogum is a daily Internet publication that focuses on music news, reviews, interviews, and commentary. The site was created in January 2002 by Scott Lapatine.

Stereogum was one of the first MP3 blogs and has received several awards and citations, including the PLUG Award for Music Blog of the Year, Blenders Powergeek 25, and Entertainment Weeklys Best Music Websites. The site was named an Official Honoree of the Webby Awards in the music category and won the OMMA Award for Web Site Excellence in the Entertainment/Music category. In 2011, Stereogum won The Village Voices Music Blog of the Year.

History
The site was named after a lyric from the song "Radio #1" by the French electronic duo Air.

In late 2006, Stereogum received an influx of capital through Bob Pittman's private investment entity The Pilot Group. In November 2007, it was purchased by SpinMedia (formerly known as Buzz Media). April 2008 saw the launch of Videogum, a sister site focused on television, movies, and Web videos. Videogum later closed.

In December 2016, Eldridge Industries acquired SpinMedia via the Hollywood Reporter-Billboard Media Group for an undisclosed amount.

Stereogums first SXSW event in 2006 was hosted by then-emerging comedian Aziz Ansari and featured a headline performance from Ted Leo. In the years since, Stereogum's events have included sets from Ben Gibbard, Sky Ferreira, Mitski, Beach House, St. Vincent, Deerhunter, Japanese Breakfast, Rico Nasty, and other popular acts.

Stereogum was the first major publication to write about future superstar acts like Arcade Fire, Vampire Weekend, and Billie Eilish.

Popular musicians have been known to participate in Stereogums active comments section, such as Father John Misty, Weezer's Rivers Cuomo, and Fleet Foxes' Robin Pecknold.

In July 2017, Arcade Fire created the parody site Stereoyum featuring a "Premature Premature Evaluation" of their forthcoming album Everything Now.

On January 16, 2020 it was announced that Scott Lapatine, the site’s founder and editor-and-chief, had reached an agreement to purchase Stereogum from the Hollywood Reporter-Billboard Media Group, making it once again an independent publication.

Album of the Year

Music releases
In July 2007, Stereogum released OKX, a tenth anniversary tribute to Radiohead's OK Computer. Cover songs were solicited from fourteen indie rock artists including Doveman, Vampire Weekend, John Vanderslice, David Bazan, Cold War Kids, My Brightest Diamond, Marissa Nadler, Chris Funk of The Decemberists, and Chris Walla of Death Cab for Cutie. The album can be heard free of charge at http://www.stereogum.com/okx.

Other free Stereogum compilation albums include: Drive XV, a tribute to R.E.M.'s Automatic for the People (featuring Rogue Wave, Meat Puppets, Sara Quin, and Dr. Dog); Enjoyed, a tribute to Björk's Post (featuring Liars, Edward Droste, Dirty Projectors, Final Fantasy, and Atlas Sound); Stroked, a tribute to The Strokes's Is This It (featuring Real Estate, Owen Pallett, Peter Bjorn & John, and The Morning Benders); MySplice Vols 1-4:, an annual mashup collaboration with team9; and Stereogum Presents... RAC Vol. 1, the first release from Grammy-winning producer RAC.

In 2020, as part of a fundraising effort to keep the site operational and independent, an original 55-track compilation of covers of songs from the 2000s by various artists titled Save Stereogum: An '00s Covers Comp was released as an incentive for donors to the site's Indiegogo campaign. The campaign totaled over $370,000 in donations. It debuted at #1 on Billboard’s Compilation Albums chart and #11 on Billboard’s Top Album Sales chart.

References

External links
 

American music websites
Internet properties established in 2002
Music blogs
Music review websites
Online music magazines published in the United States